Kuklos means "ring" or "circle" in Greek, and may also refer to:

 Kuklos Adelphon, a defunct fraternity which was founded at the University of North Carolina in 1812
 Kuklos Anankes, the circle of necessity in mysticism
 Kuklos, a revolving restaurant atop the Berneuse in the Swiss Alps
 Ku Klux Klan, an American terrorist and political movement that took its name from the Greek term
 Fitzwater Wray (c.1870–1938), British cycling journalist, who used the pseudonym Kuklos